Hysen is a male given name and a surname and may refer to:

Given name
 Hysen Bytyqi (born 1968), Kosovan animal scientist
 Hysen Pulaku (born 1992), Albanian Weightlifter 
 Hysen Zmijani (born 1963), Albanian soccer player

Surname
 see Hysén

See also
 Hysen Pasha Mosque

Albanian masculine given names